Calosoma janssensi is a species of ground beetle in the subfamily of Carabinae. It was described by Basilewsky in 1953.

References

janssensi
Beetles described in 1953